Moore County Courthouse is a historic courthouse located at Carthage, Moore County, North Carolina.  It was built in 1922–1923, and is a three-story, rectangular, limestone-faced building in the Renaissance Revival style.  It has a rusticated base pierced by arched paired windows, upper floor windows divided by pilasters, and a series of Ionic order half columns in the slightly recessed central section.

It was added to the National Register of Historic Places in 1979.

References

County courthouses in North Carolina
Courthouses on the National Register of Historic Places in North Carolina
Renaissance Revival architecture in North Carolina
Government buildings completed in 1923
Buildings and structures in Moore County, North Carolina
National Register of Historic Places in Moore County, North Carolina